Deportivo Alavés, S.A.D. (Sporting Alavés), usually abbreviated to Alavés, is a Spanish football club based in Vitoria-Gasteiz, Álava, in the autonomous community of the Basque Country. Founded on 1 July 1920 as Sport Friends Club, it has played in the highest football category of The Liga Nacional de Fútbol Profesional, La Liga, since the 2016–17 season. Alavés play in the Segunda División, after being relegated from La Liga in the 2021–22 season.

It is recognized as the third most successful team in the Basque Country following Athletic Club of Bilbao and Real Sociedad de Futbol of San Sebastián. Its biggest success was in 2001 when, in the year of its debut in European competition, it reached the 2001 UEFA Cup Final, where it played against Liverpool. It was defeated 5–4 by golden goal. In 2017, the club reached the final of the Copa del Rey, losing out 3–1 to Barcelona.

The team's home kit is blue and white-striped shirt, blue shorts and white socks. It holds home matches at the 19,840-seater Mendizorrotza Stadium and uses other facilities located in Ibaia dedicated to training.

History

Founded in 1920 the initial name of the club was Sport Friends, but on 23 January 1921 the name was changed to the current one, and this is considered the official foundation date. Alavés was the first club to win promotion from the Segunda División to La Liga in 1929–30, a stint which would last three years. In its first season in Primera División Alavés finished 8th from 10 teams, just 1 point away from being relegated.

In 1953–54 the club would reach the top league again for a two-year spell. With Roman Galarraga as a coach, the club reached long-awaited promotion to Segunda División in the 1973–74 season. In June 1983, after having avoided the relegation in the previous season, Alavés went down to Segunda División B, where remained until the 1985–86 campaign. After years of seriously facing disappearance which lasted well into the 1990s (playing in the fourth tier during the late 1980s), Alavés finally achieved a promotion back into the Segunda División in 1994–95 after two consecutive years of winning their group in Segunda División B – created as the new third level in 1977 – but failing in the promotion play-offs.

After winning the Segunda División in 1997–98, Alavés returned to the top level after a 42-year hiatus. Following their return season in which they escaped relegation by a single point, they achieved two wins against Barcelona in the following campaign and would qualify for the UEFA Cup for the first time upon finishing sixth (to date, their highest-ever placing, coming just 12 years after their lowest-ever: eighth in their group in the fourth level).

As well as concluding the domestic campaign in tenth position, in 2000–01 the Basque club reached the final of the UEFA Cup after beating Internazionale, Rayo Vallecano and 1. FC Kaiserslautern, the latter in a crushing 9–2 aggregate victory. The final ended in a 4–5 loss against Liverpool, Alavés losing to an "own-golden goal" after taking the match to extra time. The match also featured two red cards and two disallowed goals in extra time in addition to the nine goals which did count, and has been described by some observers as one of the greatest showpiece games in the competition's history.

Alavés ended 2001–02 in seventh position and qualified for the UEFA Cup for a second time, although the European campaign of 2002–03 was far less successful than two years earlier, with an opening win over Ankaragücü followed by a defeat to another Turkish Süper Lig side, Beşiktaş. On 26 January 2003, the club celebrated their 100th win in La Liga after defeating Real Valladolid 3–1.

Although Alavés were relegated after 2002–03, they regained top flight status two years later. In this time, Alavés was bought by Ukrainian–American businessman Dmitry Pietrman, and several clashes followed with the club's coaches, players and fans alike. The top-division return only lasted one season as the club went through three head coaches and finished in 18th position, one point from safety. Piterman departed in 2007, leaving the club deep in debt after his tenure. After two years of battling against relegation to the third level, Alavés eventually succumbed in 2008–09.

A subsequent black period in Segunda B lasted four years until Alavés was bought by José Antonio Querejeta and were promoted again to the second division in 2013 as overall champions of the third tier, providing an opportunity to sort out its economic difficulties. Three years later, on 29 May 2016, Alavés was promoted to La Liga as second tier champions after beating Numancia 2–0 to overtake Leganés on the final day.

On 10 September 2016, Alavés got their first win of their return season in La Liga by defeating defending La Liga champions Barcelona 2–1 at the Camp Nou.  On 7 February 2017, Alavés qualified for the 2017 Copa del Rey Final after eliminating Celta de Vigo in the semi-finals of the competition. This was the first time in their history that the club had qualified for the final of the national cup, their previous best being the semi-finals in 1998 and 2004. Their opponents in the final would be Barcelona, and coincidentally the two clubs met in the league directly after their cup semi-finals; the Catalans inflicted a 6–0 defeat on Alavés in their own Mendizorrotza Stadium, exacting revenge for the result earlier in the season. Barcelona also won the final, held at the Estadio Vicente Calderón with a 3–1 scoreline, meaning there would be no return to European competition for Alavés. In the La Liga that season Alavés finished 9th with 14 wins, 13 draws and 11 losses. In the 2021–22 season, Alaves were relegated following defeat on the penultimate matchday by Levante (who also went down) to end their six-year stay in La Liga, the longest top-flight run in the club's history.

Seasons

Season to season

17 seasons in La Liga
38 seasons in Segunda División
12 seasons in Segunda División B
22 seasons in Tercera División
1 season in Categorías Regionales

Recent seasons
{|class="wikitable"
|-bgcolor="#efefef"
! Season
! Div
! Pos.
! Pld
! W
! D
! L
! GF
! GA
! Pld
!Cup
!colspan=2|Europe
!Notes
|-
|2012–13
|2B2
|align=right |1st
|align=right|38||align=right|25||align=right|7||align=right|6
|align=right|57||align=right|22||align=right|82
||Round of 32
|||
|bgcolor=lightgreen|Promoted
|-
|2013–14
|2A
|align=right |18th
|align=right|42||align=right|13||align=right|12||align=right|17
|align=right|57||align=right|57||align=right|51
||Third round
|||||
|-
|2014–15
|2A
|align=right |13th
|align=right|42||align=right|14||align=right|11||align=right|17
|align=right|49||align=right|53||align=right|53
||Round of 32
|||||
|-
|2015–16
|2A
|align=right |1st
|align=right|42||align=right|21||align=right|12||align=right|9
|align=right|49||align=right|35||align=right|75
||Third round
||||
|bgcolor=lightgreen|Promoted
|-
|2016–17
|1
|align=right |9th
|align=right|38||align=right|14||align=right|13||align=right|11
|align=right|41||align=right|43||align=right|55
|bgcolor=silver|Runners-up
|||||
|-
|2017–18
|1
|align=right |14th
|align=right|38||align=right|15||align=right|2||align=right|21
|align=right|40||align=right|50||align=right|47
||Quarter-finals
|||||
|-
|2018–19
|1
|align=right |11th
|align=right|38||align=right|13||align=right|11||align=right|14
|align=right|39||align=right|50||align=right|50
||Round of 32
|||||
|-
|2019–20
|1
|align=right |16th
|align=right|38||align=right|10||align=right|9||align=right|19
|align=right|34||align=right|59||align=right|39
||First round
|||||
|-
|2020–21
|1
|align=right |16th
|align=right|38||align=right|9||align=right|11||align=right|18
|align=right|36||align=right|57||align=right|38
||Round of 32
|||||
|-
|2021–22
|1
|align=right |20th
|align=right|38||align=right|8||align=right|7||align=right|23
|align=right|31||align=right|65||align=right|31
||Second round
||||
|bgcolor=pink|Relegated
|}

Players

Current squad

Reserve team

Out on loan

Honours

Domestic competitions
 Segunda División
 Winners (4): 1929–30, 1953–54, 1997–98, 2015–16

Segunda División B
 Winners (4): 1992–93, 1993–94, 1994–95, 2012–13

Tercera División
 Winners (5):  1940–41, 1960–61, 1964–65, 1967–68, 1973–74
 Winners: 1989–90

Regional Championship
Biscay Championship: 1929–30
Gipuzkoa Championship: 1938–39

Copa Federación de España
 Winners: 1945–46

Copa del Rey
 Runners-up: 2016–17

European competitions
UEFA Cup
 Runners-up: 2000–01

Notes

Stadium information

Name – Mendizorrotza
City – Vitoria-Gasteiz
Capacity – 19,840
Inauguration – 1924
Pitch size – 105 m x 67 m
Other facilities – El Glorioso and José Luis Compañón

Famous players

World Cup players
The following players have been selected by their country in the World Cup Finals, while playing for Alavés.

  John Aloisi (2006)
  John Guidetti (2018)

Coaching staff

Coaches

 Amadeo García (1926–27)
 Walter Harris (1928)
 Ramón Encinas (1931–32)
 Amadeo García (1932–39)
 Baltasar Albéniz (1939)
 Francisco Gamborena (1940–41)
 Baltasar Albéniz (1947–48)
 Manuel Echezarreta (1954–56)
 Rafael Iriondo (1958–59)
 Manuel Echezarreta (1959–60)
 Ignacio Izagirre (1968–69) 
 Ferenc Puskás (1968–69) 
 García de Andoin (1972)
 Koldo Aguirre (1972–73)
 Ignacio Eizaguirre (1975)
 Joseíto (1976–78)
 Jesús Aranguren (1978–80)
 García de Andoin (1980–82)
 Mané (1984–85)
 Nando Yosu (1985–86)
 Luis Costa (1992–93)
 José Antonio Irulegui (1993–94)
 Jesús Aranguren (1994–97)
 Mané (1997–03)
 Jesús Aranguren (2003)
 Pepe Mel (2003–04)
 Chuchi Cos (2004–06)
 Juan Carlos Oliva (2006)
 Mario Luna (2006)
 Julio Bañuelos (2006)
 Chuchi Cos (2006–07)
 Fabri (2007)
 Mario Luna (2007)
 Josu Uribe (2007–08)
 Julio Bañuelos (2008)
 José María Salmerón (2008)
 Manix Mandiola (2008–09)
 Javi López (2009)
 Luis de la Fuente (2011)
 José Carlos Granero (2011–12)
 Natxo González (2012–13)
 Juan Carlos Mandiá (2013–14)
 Alberto López (2014–15)
 José Bordalás (2015–16)
 Mauricio Pellegrino (2016–17)
 Luis Zubeldía (2017)
 Gianni De Biasi (2017)
 Abelardo (2017–19)
 Asier Garitano (2019–20)
 Pablo Machín (2020–2021)
 Abelardo (2021)
 Javier Calleja (2021)
 José Luis Mendilibar (2021–2022)
 Julio Velázquez (2022)
 Luis García Plaza (2022-Present)

Affiliated clubs

Alavés B/C

The club's primary reserve team is Deportivo Alavés B, founded in 1960 and currently playing at the amateur Tercera División level of the senior Spanish system. When that team gained promotion to Segunda División B in 2000, a further reserve side Deportivo Alavés C was formed, later partnering with local team Club San Ignacio, but the C-team was discontinued in 2005 due to the poor financial situation at the club. San Ignacio and most other teams in the vicinity of Vitoria-Gasteiz continue to operate as partner clubs of Alavés.

California Victory
In 2007, Alavés operated a team in the USL First Division in the United States called the California Victory. The team played at Kezar Stadium in San Francisco, California, and wore the Alavés colors. However, Alavés, under new ownership, pulled its support for the club later that year, after which the Victory folded.

NK Rudeš
In May 2017, Alavés signed a ten-year partnership deal with NK Rudeš, freshly promoted Croatian First Football League club, with Rudeš acting as a feeder club to Alavés.
In June 2018, Deportivo Alavés and NK Rudeš ended its partnership agreement.

Sochaux
In April 2018, Alavés signed an agreement with French club FC Sochaux-Montbéliard; however the partnership lasted only a few months, ending abruptly in December of the same year.

NK Istra 1961
In June 2018 Alavés took a controlling interest in another Croatian top-tier club, NK Istra 1961, a few weeks after ending their agreement with Rudeš.

References

External links

Official website 
 Alavés at La Liga 
 Alavés at UEFA 
 Club profile at BDfutbol (match reports in each season)
Club history at El Correo
Futbolme team profile 
Glorioso, unofficial website 
Terra club info  

 
Association football clubs established in 1921
Football clubs in the Basque Country (autonomous community)
1921 establishments in Spain
La Liga clubs
Sport in Vitoria-Gasteiz
Segunda División clubs